Where It's At! is the debut album by organist Charles Kynard recorded in 1963 in California and released on the Pacific Jazz label.

Reception
The Allmusic site awarded the album 3 stars stating "This is Kynard's first album and it has not been reissued".

Track listing 
All compositions by Charles Kynard except as indicated
 "I'll Fly Away" (Albert E. Brumley) - 3:37   
 "Amazing Grace" (John Newton) - 2:42   
 "Motherless Child" (Traditional) - 2:37   
 "The Lord Will Make a Way Somehow" (Hezekiah Walker) - 4:47   
 "I Want To Be Ready" - 2:20   
 "Smooth Sailing" - 3:12   
 "I Wonder" - 5:13   
 "Blue Greens and Beans" (Mal Waldron) - 3:24   
 "Sports Lament" - 5:03   
 "Where It's At" - 3:45

Personnel 
Charles Kynard - organ  
Clifford Scott - tenor saxophone, alto saxophone (tracks 2-10)
Ronnell Bright - piano (track 1)
Ray Crawford (track 1), Howard Roberts (tracks 2-10) - guitar
Leroy Henderson (track 1), Milt Turner (tracks 2-10) - drums

References 

1963 albums
Pacific Jazz Records albums
Charles Kynard albums